The Atlantic Coast Hockey League (ACHL) was a minor league hockey organization that operated between 1981 and 1987. The league was founded by Bill Coffey.  The Bob Payne Trophy was awarded to the team who won the league playoff championship.

According to a 1985 Montreal Gazette article, rookies were paid "$150 a week plus $35 for a victory" and veterans were paid "as much as $300 a week." League regulations also said that half the roster (eight out of fifteen players) must be rookie Americans.

Formation
The ACHL's roots can be traced back to the former Eastern Hockey League (EHL) of the late 1970s and early 1980s. With a meeting of several EHL owners, the league decided to fold on July 19, 1981, and reorganize as the Atlantic Coast Hockey League. Teams and cities that were previous members of the Eastern Hockey League were interested in rejoining the league. Because the Mohawk Valley team being the most northern, the league was interested in inviting a sixth team to bridge the gap. Johnstown previously had an EHL team affiliated with the Red Wings and were the intended sixth team but due to the owner being ill, they were removed from the list. Richmond expressed interest, but due to questions about the financial stability of the league, they also dropped out. The Boston Bruins, along with several investors, were approached about putting a team in nearby Cape Cod. After an investor dropped out, Cape Cod Coliseum and WWF owner Vince McMahon purchased the rights to the franchise for $15,000.

Inaugural season
The ACHL opened with seven teams:
Salem Raiders
Winston-Salem Thunderbirds
Mohawk Valley Stars
Baltimore Skipjacks
Cape Cod Buccaneers
Fitchburg Trappers
Schenectady Chiefs.

From the opening night of the season, McMahon was not happy with how the league was run. Schenectady and Fitchburg were owned by the same person. Fitchburg was placed under a league suspension and would fold after 6 games. Schenectady would fold after 9 games. In January 1982, McMahon tried to borrow $15,000 from the league, citing "slow cash flow". When the league denied his loan, McMahon folded his franchise. With the league now down to 4 teams, the league decided to end the season early and set the playoffs by geographical area to save on expenses. Coincidentally, the matchups did end up having the first and fourth place teams meet, along with the second vs third place teams. The Salem Raiders defeated the Winston-Salem Thunderbirds, and the Mohawk Valley Stars defeated the Baltimore Skipjacks. The Raiders and Stars played in the league final, with the Mohawk Valley Stars defeating the Raiders for the Bob Payne Trophy.

On July 24, 1987, Commissioner Ray Miron announced that the league would be suspending operations for the 1987–88 season. The Troy Slapshots had folded earlier in the previous season, and the Mohawk Valley Comets in Utica, NY had been replaced with an American Hockey League team. This left the league with only three teams—Erie, Virginia, and Carolina—not enough for it to make sense to operate. Erie would cease operations, but the Lancers and Thunderbirds would transfer to the All-American Hockey League.

ACHL to ECHL
Two teams from the current ECHL have roots tracing back to the Atlantic Coast Hockey League

Wheeling Nailers:
1981–82: Winston-Salem Thunderbirds (ACHL)
1982–87: Carolina Thunderbirds (ACHL)
1987–88: Carolina Thunderbirds (AAHL)
1988–89: Carolina Thunderbirds (ECHL)
1989–92: Winston-Salem Thunderbirds (ECHL)
1992–96: Wheeling Thunderbirds (ECHL)
1996–present: Wheeling Nailers (ECHL)

Utah Grizzlies:
1981–1983: Nashville South Stars (CHL/ACHL)
1983–1990: Virginia Lancers (ACHL/AAHL/ECHL)
1990–1992: Roanoke Valley Rebels (ECHL)
1992–1993: Roanoke Valley Rampage (ECHL)
1993–1994: Huntsville Blast (ECHL)
1994–2001: Tallahassee Tiger Sharks (ECHL)
2001–2002: Macon Whoopee (ECHL)
2002–2003: Lexington Men O' War (ECHL)
2005–present: Utah Grizzlies (ECHL)

Teams
Salem Raiders (1981–1982)
Mohawk Valley Stars (1981–1985)
Baltimore Skipjacks (1981–1982)
Cape Cod Buccaneers (1981–1982)
Winston-Salem/Carolina Thunderbirds (1981–82, 1982–87)
Schenectady Chiefs (1981–1982)
Fitchburg Trappers (1981–1982)
Erie Golden Blades (1982–1987)
Virginia Raiders (1982–1983)
Hampton Roads Gulls (1982–1983)
Nashville South Stars (1982–1983)
Virginia Lancers (1983–1987)
Pinebridge Bucks (1983–1985)
Birmingham Bulls (1983–1984), folded after 3 games
Mohawk Valley Comets (1985–1987)
New York Slapshots (1985–1986)
Troy Slapshots (1986–1987), folded after 6 games

Unnamed team
In December 1985, Recreational Ice of North Carolina (RINC) was granted an ACHL franchise. RINC general manager Bob Ohrablo had planned to put the franchise in Asheville, North Carolina. The team was to play in a newly built arena, the 3200-seat Asheville Ice Garden. The arena was to be completed in October 1986 and the team was supposed to start play during the 1986–87 season.

A name the team contest was to be held in February 1986, with the winner to be announced in March. It is unknown if a winner was ever announced.

Awards

Bob Payne Trophy
The Bob Payne Trophy was awarded to the playoff champion at the end of each season. The trophy is named after Bob Payne, an executive with several teams in the Southern Hockey League and Eastern Hockey League. The trophy was loaned to the winning team for one year and was returned at the start of the following year's playoffs. The Carolina Thunderbirds were the only multiple winners of the trophy, having won it three of the six years, including back-to-back wins in 1984–85 and 1985–86.

1981–82: Mohawk Valley Stars
1982–83: Carolina Thunderbirds
1983–84: Erie Golden Blades
1984–85: Carolina Thunderbirds
1985–86: Carolina Thunderbirds
1986–87: Virginia Lancers

Regular season champions
1981–82: Salem Raiders
1982–83: Carolina Thunderbirds
1983–84: Carolina Thunderbirds
1984–85: Carolina Thunderbirds
1985–86: Carolina Thunderbirds
1986–87: Virginia Lancers

ACHL All-Stars
1981–82: Jim Stewart, G, Baltimore (1st team)
1982–83: Dave Watson, W, Carolina (1st team); Michel Lanouette, W, Carolina (1st team); Ron Carter, RW, Nashville/Virginia (2nd team); Brian Carroll, W, Carolina (2nd team); Randy Irving, D, Carolina (2nd team)
1983–84: Pierre Hamel, G, Carolina (1st team); Randy Irving, D, Carolina (1st team); Darrell May, G, Erie (2nd team); Paul O'Neil, C, Virginia (2nd team); Frank Perkins, Head Coach, Pinebridge (1st team); Barry Tabobondung, D/LW, Erie (2nd team)
1984–85: Ray LeBlanc, G, Pinebridge (1st team); Bob Hagan, Carolina (1st team); Randy Irving, D, Carolina (1st team); Paul Mancini, LW, Erie (1st team); Barry Tabobondung, D/LW, Erie (1st team)
1985–86: Ray LeBlanc, G, Carolina (1st team); Paul Mancini, LW, Erie (1st team); Jim Cowell, Erie (2nd team); John Hill, Virginia (2nd team); Randy Irving, D, Carolina (2nd team)
1986–87: Pete DeArmas, RW, Virginia (1st team); Jeff Eatough, RW, Mohawk Valley (2nd team)

ACHL MVP
 1981–82: Dave MacQueen, Salem Raiders
 1982–83: Rory Cava, Carolina Thunderbirds
 1983–84: Paul O'Neil, Virginia Lancers
 1984–85: Barry Tabobondung, Erie Golden Blades
 1985–86: Joe Curran, Carolina Thunderbirds
 1986–87: Pete DeArmas, Virginia Lancers

ACHL Playoff MVP
 1984–85: Brian Carroll, Carolina Thunderbirds
 1985–86: Bob Doré, Carolina Thunderbirds

ACHL Rookie Of The Year
 1984–85: Todd Bjorkstrand, Pinebridge Bucks; Kurt Rugenius, Mohawk Valley Stars (tie)
 1985–86: Bobby Williams, New York Slapshots
 1986–87: Scott Knutson, Carolina Thunderbirds; Scott Curwin, Virginia Lancers

Seasons
1981–82 ACHL season
1982–83 ACHL season
1983–84 ACHL season
1984–85 ACHL season
1985–86 ACHL season
1986–87 ACHL season

References

See also
List of ice hockey leagues
Minor league

 
Defunct ice hockey leagues in the United States
Sports leagues established in 1981
Sports leagues disestablished in 1987
1981 establishments in the United States
1987 disestablishments in the United States

fr:Atlantic Coast Hockey League (2002)